CPOA may refer to:

California Peace Officers' Association
Chief Petty Officer Academy